This is the results breakdown of the local elections held in Castile and León on 26 May 2019. The following tables show detailed results in the autonomous community's most populous municipalities, sorted alphabetically.

Opinion polls

City control
The following table lists party control in the most populous municipalities, including provincial capitals (shown in bold). Gains for a party are displayed with the cell's background shaded in that party's colour.

Municipalities

Ávila
Population: 57,657

Burgos
Population: 175,921

León
Population: 124,772

Palencia
Population: 78,629

Ponferrada
Population: 65,239

Salamanca
Population: 143,978

Segovia
Population: 51,683

Soria
Population: 39,112

Valladolid
Population: 298,866

Zamora
Population: 61,827

See also
2019 Castilian-Leonese regional election

References

Castile and León
2019